Hyderabad railway division is one of the three divisions of South Central Railway zone of the Indian Railways. The headquarters of the Division is at Secunderabad and its zonal headquarters is at Secunderabad. Even though Hyderabad has its own Division, the Hyderabad Deccan railway station itself falls under Secunderabad Railway Division. Secunderabad–Manmad section also known as Kacheguda–Manmad line is an important Railway route connecting the States of Telangana and Maharashtra, most Stations on this route are administrated by Hyderabad Division and Nanded railway division.

History
Hyderabad Division has carved out from Secunderabad railway division on 17 November 1977. In 2003 the Hyderabad division was further carved out to form Nanded railway division.

Structure
The division covers a route of  having  total of 104 stations. The division is responsible for maintenance of almost all railway assets and estates in the twin cities of Hyderabad and Secunderabad.

Routes

Under construction

 Makthal (MKTHL)–Krishna (KSN) .
Gajwel (GAJWL)-kothapalli(KPHI) - part of the Manoharabad-Kothapally new railway line, expected 2025 -

Major stations and categories
The list includes the stations  under the Hyderabad division and their station category

See also

 Divisions of Indian Railways

References

 
Divisions of Indian Railways